Branko Dangubić (13 July 1922 in Ljubinje, Kingdom of Serbs, Croats and Slovenes (present-day Bosnia and Herzegovina) – 24 November 2002 in Belgrade, FR Yugoslavia) was a Serbian javelin thrower who competed in the 1952 Summer Olympics. He finished fifth. At the 1951 Mediterranean Games, he won a gold medal in the men's javelin throw.

References

1922 births
2002 deaths
Serbian male javelin throwers
Yugoslav male javelin throwers
Olympic athletes of Yugoslavia
Athletes (track and field) at the 1952 Summer Olympics
Athletes (track and field) at the 1951 Mediterranean Games
Mediterranean Games gold medalists for Yugoslavia
Mediterranean Games medalists in athletics
Serbs of Bosnia and Herzegovina